Pavlos Vartziotis (born 27 January 1981) is a Greek footballer who is currently playing for Thiella Katsikas.

Vartziotis began his playing career by signing with Anagennisi Arta F.C. in July 1997.

References

 Guardian Football
 Pavlos Vartziotis profile (EPSIP) Amateur division

1981 births
Living people
Greek footballers
A.O. Kerkyra players
PAS Giannina F.C. players
Proodeftiki F.C. players
Panetolikos F.C. players
Doxa Kranoula F.C. players
Anagennisi Arta F.C. players
Association football defenders
Footballers from Ioannina